Nestegis lanceolata, commonly called white maire, is a tree native to New Zealand.

Nestegis lanceolata is found from lowland to hilly forest across the North Island. In the South Island it is uncommon but is found in the Marlborough Sounds.

It grows to approximately 15 metres high and has long (5–12 cm), leathery and glossy leaves. Racemes of green flowers are produced in spring followed by a 1 cm long red fruit.

Uses
The wood of N. lanceolata is one of the hardest native timbers of New Zealand. It was traditionally used by the Māori to make tools and weapons. A variety of digging sticks were made from the timber for food gathering and gardening. The wood was also used for beams in the construction of storage houses.

References

lanceolata
Trees of New Zealand
Plants described in 1958